Torah Live is a Jewish educational Torah organization founded by Rabbi Dan Roth that combines interactive multimedia presentations with live lecturers to teach Jewish law, philosophy, and ethics. Torah Live presents to diverse audiences from Ultra-Orthodox yeshiva students to secular Jewish businessmen in both kiruv and standard Orthodox settings. As of 2011, Torah Live has presented over 150 lectures in 50 cities worldwide including two Torah Umesorah Conventions, the United Synagogue Rabbi Convention in London, the Munich Conversion Conference, and Her Majesty's Treasury in Westminster. Torah Live has rabbinical approbations from British Chief Rabbi Lord Jonathan Sacks, Rabbi Yisrael Reisman of Agudath Israel, and Rabbi Yitzchak Berkovits.

History
Torah Live was founded by Rabbi Dan Roth in 2009 after he developed a multimedia class for a group of teenagers entitled “How to Make the Big Bucks” about the mitzvah of tithes or ma'asser. At the time, Rabbi Roth was a teacher in Yeshiva Ohr Somayach’s Yesod program and was looking for ways to catch the attention of his students. “Modern media has changed the way people learn. We have to ‘translate’ the eternal truths of our Torah into today’s language,” he said. 

Rabbi Roth's colleague Josh Goldberg recognized the unique potential of this approach to revolutionize Jewish education and encouraged and coached Dan to take his material global. After a few months of market testing at the local Jewish education institutions,  Rabbi Dan Roth subsequently recruited a team of graphic designers and programmers and started producing multimedia presentations on topics such as blessings, sukkah, yichud, tzedakkah, and mezuzah. 

All material is in line with Orthodox legal rulings under the general oversight of Rabbi Yitzchak Berkovits, Dean of The Center for Jewish Values, the Rosh Kollel of the Jerusalem Kollel and a notable halachic authority amongst the English speaking Israeli community.

Rabbi Roth was born in London, and moved to Israel in 2000, where he resides today with his wife and children. Rabbi Roth is also the author of “Relevance—Pirkei Avos for the Twenty First Century.”

Mission
Torah Live's mission is to show the relevance of Torah to today's generation. Following the words of Rav Samson Raphael Hirsch, the goal is to show that “authentic Judaism . . . does not belong to an antiquated past but to a living, pulsating present . . .” Their mission statement states that “while the ‘language’ in which Torah is taught, and the challenges to which it is applied, change as the world turns, the core message and relevancy of Torah remain the same.”

Presentations
Torah Live’s presentations combine speakers, 3-D graphics, and videos and can be watched straight or in conjunction with a live lecture. All presentations explain the mitzvah from the Biblical source all the way to modern day applications and also include deeper reasons behind the commandment. To date, Torah Live’s presentations include the following titles: 
How to Make the Big Bucks – Torah Live’s very first presentation about the mitzvah of maisser kesafim—the Biblical obligation to tithe one’s income.
Mezuzah – The Ultimate Connector – A comprehensive look at the laws of mezuzah presented through 3-D diagrams, videos, and stories. In addition to the Home version, a PRO version for educators is also available, complete with lesson plans, speaker notes, source sheets, a 3-D interactive wall with dozens of real life scenarios, and two versions of the presentation.
Sukkah—The Ultimate Shelter - A step by step, multimedia guide to the laws of the four species.

Organizational goals
Torah Live licenses its materials to schools and kiruv organizations around the world, providing them with the training and tools to run the presentations themselves for the benefit of their students and communities. Torah Live programs have been purchased by organizations in the U.S., England, South Africa, and Israel. It has also begun to make its materials available on DVD for home or group viewing.

Staff
Rabbi Dan Roth, Founder and Director of Torah Live. 
Mr. Joshua Goldberg, Creative Director.
Ariel Bauer – Torah Live’s designer and 3-D graphic artist uses Photoshop, After Effects, Maya and Flash, as well as freehand drawing and painting to bring the presentations to life.
Rabbi Chaim Yitzchak Yudkovski - Torah Live’s Hebrew representative.
Rabbi Yonason Shippel – In addition to being a Senior Gateways lecturer, Rabbi Shippel is Torah Live’s New York representative and has been licensed to present Torah Live material at Gateways seminars for both religious and secular audiences.

Consultants 
Rabbi Issamar Ginzberg, Marketing.

Notable venues
Her Majesty's Treasury in Westminster, London
The Mir Yeshiva in Jerusalem
 The Torah U'Mesorah Convention
Dayan Ehrentreu’s Conversion Conference in Munich

References

External links 
 "TorahLive.com
 "Stepping Up," Mishpacha Magazine
 "Torah Live Mezuzah Presentation--A New Approach to an Ancient Mitzvah," Jewish Press
 "Relevance," Feldheim

Jewish mass media in the United States